Joachim Brohmann (born 19 February 1945) is a German equestrian. He competed in two events at the 1972 Summer Olympics.

References

External links
 

1945 births
Living people
German male equestrians
Olympic equestrians of East Germany
Equestrians at the 1972 Summer Olympics
People from Gardelegen
Sportspeople from Saxony-Anhalt